Antonis Aidonis (born 22 May 2001) is a German professional footballer who plays as a centre back for  club VfB Stuttgart.

Club career
Aidonis made his professional debut for VfB Stuttgart in the Bundesliga on 10 November 2018, coming on as a substitute in the 90+1st minute for Santiago Ascacíbar in the 2–0 away win against 1. FC Nürnberg.

On 5 July 2021, Aidonis was sent on a year long loan to Dynamo Dresden.

International career
Aidonis was included in Germany's squad for the 2018 edition of the UEFA European Under-17 Championship in England, where the team was eliminated in the group stage.

Personal life
Aidonis was born in Neustadt an der Weinstraße, Rhineland-Palatinate and is of Greek descent.

References

External links
 
 
 Profile at kicker.de

2001 births
Living people
People from Neustadt an der Weinstraße
Footballers from Rhineland-Palatinate
German footballers
Germany youth international footballers
German people of Greek descent
Association football defenders
VfB Stuttgart players
VfB Stuttgart II players
Dynamo Dresden players
Bundesliga players
2. Bundesliga players